Isaac Beverly Lake Sr. (1906–1996), was an American jurist, law professor at Wake Forest University and Campbell University, and politician. He was born in Wake Forest, North Carolina.

Early career
A graduate of Wake Forest College and Harvard Law School, Lake joined the staff of North Carolina Attorney General Harry McMullan in 1950. There, he drew upon his knowledge of public utility law to handle rate cases before the state Utilities Commission, which earned him a reputation as a consumer advocate. When the United States Supreme Court invited North Carolina to appear as amicus curiae in the famous Brown v. Board of Education case in 1954, Lake argued against it, telling the governor that it was a "diabolical scheme" designed to subject the state directly to whatever orders the Court issued as a consequence of the decision. The governor nevertheless decided to file an amicus brief, and Lake presented the state's case in defense of segregation before the Supreme Court during hearings over "Brown II".

1960 campaign for governor
After the Supreme Court handed down its decision insisting on the dismantling of the state's segregated school system, Lake attacked the National Association for the Advancement of Colored People in a speech in Asheboro, accusing it of agitating the state's African-American population.  Lake's speech established him as a leader of the state's segregationists, some of whom suggested that he should run for governor.  Now in private practice, Lake remained coy but continued to assist segregationist efforts, attacking the sitting governor, Luther Hodges, for caving in to national pressure to adopt a moderate course and preparing a bill for the North Carolina General Assembly that would have amended the state's constitution to remove the requirement for a system of publicly funded schools.

Yet as the 1960 gubernatorial election approached, Lake initially announced that he would not be a candidate for governor due to a lack of funds.  The entry of the state's moderate attorney-general, Malcolm Seawell into the race, along with the start of the lunch-counter demonstrations in Greensboro caused Lake to change his mind, and he announced his candidacy for the office.  In one advertisement, he wrote "The mixing of our two great races in the classroom and then in the home is not inevitable and is not to be tolerated.". Lake made segregation the dominant issue of his campaign, attacking Hodges's management of integration and the NAACP.  With Robert Burren Morgan acting as his Campaign Manager, Lake did well enough to place second in the Democratic primary to Terry Sanford, but in the subsequent runoff election, Sanford defeated Lake by a margin of 50,000 votes.

Subsequent career
In 1964 Lake ran for governor again, but he did not survive the first primary.  After conceding the race, he threw his support to Judge Dan Moore, which was crucial to Moore's victory in the runoff.  In return for his support, Moore named Lake to the next opening on the North Carolina Supreme Court.

Lake was sworn-in as an associate justice on August 30, 1965. He served until 1978.

He was the father of I. Beverly Lake Jr., who followed him into politics and law.

References

Presentation of the Portrait of I. Beverly Lake Sr.
 Triumph of Good Will: How Terry Sanford Beat a Champion of Segregation and Reshaped the South By John Drescher. See book at Google Books
Oral History Interview with I. Beverly Lake Sr. at Oral Histories of the American South
OurCampaigns.com

1906 births
1996 deaths
Justices of the North Carolina Supreme Court
North Carolina Democrats
American segregationists
North Carolina lawyers
People from Wake Forest, North Carolina
Wake Forest University faculty
Wake Forest University alumni
Harvard Law School alumni
Campbell University faculty
20th-century American judges
20th-century American lawyers
Old Right (United States)